The Saracen Blade is a 1952 historical adventure novel by the American writer Frank Yerby. It was ranked ninth on the Publishers Weekly list of bestselling novels in 1952. It is set during the reign of the Holy Roman Emperor Frederick II and follows the adventures of Pierto di Donati, the son of a Sicilian peasant, who is born at almost the same moment as the Emperor.

Film adaptation
In 1954 it was adapted into a film of the same title produced by Hollywood studio Columbia Pictures. Directed by William Castle, it starred Ricardo Montalbán, Betta St. John and Rick Jason.

References

Bibliography
 Goble, Alan. The Complete Index to Literary Sources in Film. Walter de Gruyter, 1999.
 Korda, Michael. Making the List: A Cultural History of the American Bestseller, 1900–1999 : as Seen Through the Annual Bestseller Lists of Publishers Weekly. Barnes & Noble Publishing, 2001.

1952 American novels
American historical novels
Novels by Frank Yerby
Dial Press books
Novels set in the 13th century
Novels set in Sicily
American novels adapted into films